Nicolás Ibáñez may refer to:

 Nicolás Ibáñez (footballer, born 1992), Argentine forward for Deportivo Español
 Nicolás Ibáñez (footballer, born 1994), Argentine forward for C.F. Pachuca